Goodbye Grandad (Adiós Abuelo) is a 1996 Argentine musical film directed by Emilio Vieyra and written by Isaac Aisemberg. It stars Jairo and Stella Maris Lanzani. It was filmed in Buenos Aires.

Synopsis
In this musical based around tango dancing, an integral part of Argentine culture, a tango singer assumes responsibility for the five-year-old son of an ensemble's musical director after he is forced into exile with his wife for political reasons.

Cast
 Jairo
 Stella Maris Lanzani
 Ricardo Bauleo
 Gabriel Mores
 Iliana Calabró
 Walter Canella
 Ivo Cutzarida
 Alejandra Desiderio
 Gustavo Fabi
 Leandro Ferrara
 Claudio Garófalo
 Jorge Gesdel
 Carlos Girini
 Ignacio Glaria
 Monica Gonzaga

External links
 

Argentine musical films
1996 films
1990s Spanish-language films
Tango films
1990s musical films
Films shot in Buenos Aires
1990s Argentine films
Films directed by Emilio Vieyra